Pang Mu is a village and tambon (sub-district) of Mueang Mae Hong Son District, in Mae Hong Son Province, Thailand. In 2005 it had a population of 15,577 people. The tambon contains 14 villages.

References

Tambon of Mae Hong Son province
Populated places in Mae Hong Son province